Glycine oxidase is an enzyme with systematic name glycine:oxygen oxidoreductase (deaminating). This enzyme catalyses the following chemical reaction

 glycine + H2O + O2  glyoxylate + NH3 + H2O2 (overall reaction)
(1a) glycine + O2  2-iminoacetate + H2O2
(1b) 2-iminoacetate + H2O  glyoxylate + NH3

This flavoenzyme containing non-covalently bound FAD.

References

External links 
 

EC 1.4.3